Nešić (Cyrillic script: Нешић) is a Serbian surname. It may refer to:

Nemanja Nešić
Vojna Nešić
Dragan Nešić (volleyball) (born 1970), volleyball coach from Serbia
Dragan Nešić (artist) (born 1954), Serbian artist
Marko Nešić (disambiguation)

Serbian surnames